London TravelWatch is a statutory British consumer organisation that campaigns for improvements to transport in London. It deals with all complaints from passengers using any Transport for London modes including some cycling and pedestrian issues, Victoria coach station (but not coaches or coach journeys), passengers using Eurostar (but not Eurotunnel),  the Heathrow Express rail service to Heathrow Airport and some aspects of rail travel including issues arising from the stations. It also deals with all rail complaints that are outside of the scope of the rail ombudsman and within its geographical remit. It is therefore in consumer representation terms an "appeals body". It is funded by the London Assembly and was established in its current form in July 2000.

History
The origins of London TravelWatch can be traced back over 60 years to the time of nationalisation of parts of the public transport network under the postwar Labour Government. The creation of the state-owned British Transport Commission in 1947 was accompanied by a system for national and regional advisory committees set up to represent the public interest. London was represented by the "Transport Users Consultative Committee for London", which had a duty to consider and make recommendations relating to matters brought to its notice by users, transport providers, or which it considered merited investigation. This responsibility has remained broadly unaltered and is part of TravelWatch's statutory remit today. What has changed is the extent of the body's geographical and modal remit; responsibility for its appointment and remuneration; and on several occasions, its name.

These changes were due to changes in both the way transport was run and the way London was governed. By the 1970s a "London Transport Passengers Committee" existed, appointed and paid for by the Greater London Council (GLC). It represented passengers of London Transport services but not those of the railways (still nationalised at that time). Rail passengers had separate representation by a rail users regional committee, part of a national network of rail users' committees.

When the GLC was abolished in 1986, the "London Transport Passengers Committee" became the "London Regional Passengers Committee". Its remit was extended to British Rail passengers in and around London, so in effect it absorbed the rail users' regional committee for London. When the Greater London Authority was established in 2000 it was renamed again, this time as the "London Transport Users Committee", which remains its legal name, and had its remit extended again to cover all activities of Transport for London, other than freight. In practice this included parts of the road network, so car users became part of its responsibility: there is also a duty to take particular account of the needs of pedestrians and cyclists. In 2005 LTUC adopted the operating name "London TravelWatch".

Remit

London TravelWatch's remit covers all services provided by Transport for London, including the London Underground, London Buses, the Docklands Light Railway, Tramlink, Dial-a-Ride services, London River Services and the Woolwich Ferry, taxis and private hire cars, Barclays Cycle Hire, and services operated by National Rail train operating companies starting or ending in London that are outside of the scope of the rail ombudsman and within our geographical remit, the Heathrow Express and Eurostar. The geographical area of the rail remit extends far beyond the boundaries of Greater London itself, and includes sizeable areas in the counties of Essex, Hertfordshire, Bedfordshire, Buckinghamshire, Surrey and Kent from where passengers travel into London for work and leisure purposes. This means that over half of all rail journeys within Great Britain relate to the area covered by London TravelWatch. As Transport Focus is responsible for rail outside London this produces an overlap in jurisdiction. However, in practice this relates to a small number of cases as most rail passengers who make a complaint have a clear enough idea as to whether it is, in common sense terms, a London train or not. Any ambiguity as to which consumer body should be involved in a particular case is dealt with by liaison between the two bodies with the workload associated with these processes not being significant. On policy matters the two bodies co operate when required.

The role of London TravelWatch is to:

investigate suggestions and complaints from users who are dissatisfied with the response received from the service provider;
conduct independent research and produce publications on issues affecting transport users
maintain a regular dialogue with operators;
assess the impact and make recommendations if proposals are made for the closure of a railway line or a station.

Board

The full complement of the London TravelWatch Board is a chair plus six ordinary members.  appointed for a four-year term by the London Assembly. Members of the London Assembly may not be appointed to the Board; but London Borough Councillors may be. Vacancies are advertised when they arise, and the appointments are made from amongst applicants by the GLA according to the rules governing public appointments that are to be made on the basis of merit. Arthur Leathley was appointed to replace Stephen Locke as Chair in October 2017.  Arthur Leathley was also appointed by the GLA to sit on the Board of Transport Focus (previously Passenger Focus) to represent London in national rail matters and to facilitate coordination between the two bodies.

Recent history
In March 2010 the London Assembly authorised a review into the future of London TravelWatch, undertaken by the Business and Management Committee. The Committee was empowered to examine the effectiveness of London TravelWatch as an advocate body for transport users. As part of this process, user groups across London alongside elected representatives made submissions to the Committee. In September 2010 the Committee published its findings, chiefly to recommend London TravelWatch be abolished. This was the only option put forward by the GLA for the future of transport user representation in London. (Other options that could have been considered, but were not, were to either merge London TravelWatch completely with Transport Passenger Focus (now Transport Focus), or to leave TravelWatch as a stand-alone body, but with reduced functions.) The Committee argued there was too much duplication between London TravelWatch and the national watchdog Passenger Focus that the cost of London TravelWatch was too great, and that transport users' interests would be better represented by elected politicians rather than a board composed of residents of the London TravelWatch area appointed after open competition on the basis of merit. It was proposed that rail matters in London, including complaints,  be handled by Passenger Focus. For other transport modes the complaints (appeals) function was to be transferred to a complaints unit which would be part of the London Assembly.  The remaining functions of the Board (which would cease to exist) would be carried out by the elected members of the Transport Committee.

However the implementation of the Assembly's decision which was opposed by London TravelWatch, required legislation by Parliament, as London TravelWatch has a statutory basis separate from the GLA. Accordingly, the Assembly requested that the Government introduce legislation to give effect to its wishes. The appropriate vehicle for any change would have been the Localism Act but the Minister declined to include any alteration in the status of London TravelWatch in that Bill when it originated in the House of Commons. A further complication was the decision by central government to sharply reduce the funding of Passenger Focus, which would have made any transfer of further functions to that body problematic.

When the Localism Bill was before the House of Lords an amendment was proposed at committee stage by two Liberal Democrat peers, which if passed would have transferred the functions of the London TravelWatch Board to the GLA transport committee.  The amendment due to timetabling issues, could not be taken until the report stage but was debated on the evening of 12 September 2011. In the event the amendment was withdrawn without a vote having neither Government support nor being without criticism from a number of Peers.  (The Bill received Royal Assent as the Localism Act on 15 November 2011). There are no other plans known for legislation to alter the status of London TravelWatch.

References

Transport authorities in London
Consumer organisations in the United Kingdom
Transport organisations based in London